The Declaration of Independence of the Mexican Empire is the document by which the Mexican Empire declared independence from the Spanish Empire. This founding document of the Mexican nation was drafted in the National Palace in Mexico City on September 28, 1821, by Juan José Espinosa de los Monteros, secretary of the Provisional Governmental Board.

Three copies of the act were executed. One was destroyed in a fire in 1909. The other two copies are in the Museo Histórico de Acapulco Fuerte de San Diego in Acapulco and in the General Archive of the Nation in Mexico City.

Background

On September 27, 1821, eleven years and eleven days after the Grito de Dolores, the Army of the Three Guarantees headed by Agustín de Iturbide entered Mexico City, concluding the Mexican War of Independence. On September 28, Iturbide installed the Provisional Governing Board, comprising 38 people. The board was chaired by Antonio Pérez Martínez y Robles, and Juan José Espinosa de los Monteros was secretary. The board immediately elected the five members of the Regency of the Empire.

On October 13 of the same year, Ramón Gutiérrez del Mazo, the first political chief of Mexico City, distributed a proclamation with the Declaration of Independence so all the people could read it, especially the courts, governors and military authorities, for them to publish it nationwide.

Drafting and signing
On the afternoon of September 28, members of the Board met at the National Palace to draft the Declaration of Independence of the newly independent nation. The resulting two documents were drafted in its final form by Juan José Espinosa de los Monteros, Secretary of the Board. The acts were signed by 33 of the 38 members of the Board and Iturbide as President of the Regency of the Empire. Juan O'Donojú, last Superior Political Chief of New Spain, Francisco Severo Maldonado, José Domingo Rus, José Mariano de Almanza and Miguel Sánchez Enciso did not sign the documents, but in the acts was written: Place of signature Juan O'Donojú and later his signature was added in the printed copies. The signatures of other four members were not added. Juan Jose Espinosa de los Monteros signed twice in each act, once as a member of the Board and the second as secretary, so that the acts contain 35 signatures and the designated to O'Donojú. A copy of the act was for the government and one for the board, the last one was later sent to the  Chamber of Deputies. None of the former insurgents—such as Guadalupe Victoria, Vicente Guerrero or Nicolás Bravo—signed the Declaration of Independence; the reason is unknown but probably because they wanted a Republic not an Empire.

Text

Signatories
The following is the list of the people who signed the Declaration of Independence, the names are written like in the acts. Juan O'Donoju did not sign but his name was written in the acts. Of the 38 members of the Provisional Governmental Board only 34 signed the document (including the aforementioned firm O'Donoju). The signatures of Francisco Severo Maldonado, José Domingo Rus, José Mariano de Almanza and Miguel Sánchez Enciso did not appear to have suffered a possible impairment due to illness.

 Agustín de Iturbide
 Antonio Obispo de Puebla
 Lugar de la firma de O'Donojú
 Manuel de la Bárcena
 Matías de Monteagudo
 José Yáñez
 Licenciado Juan Francisco Azcárate
 Juan José Espinosa de los Monteros
 José María Fagoaga
 José Miguel Guridi y Alcocer
 El Marqués de Salvatierra
 El Conde de Casa de Heras y Soto
 Juan Bautista Lobo
 Francisco Manuel Sánchez de Tagle
 Antonio de Gama y Córdoba
 José Manuel Sartorio
 Manuel Velázquez de León
 Manuel Montes Argüelles
 Manuel de la Sota Riva
 El Marqués de San Juan de Rayas
 José Ignacio García Illueca
 José María de Bustamante
 José María de Cervantes y Velasco
 Juan Cervantes y Padilla
 José Manuel Velázquez de la Cadena
 Juan Horbegoso
 Nicolás Campero
 El Conde de Jala y de Regla
 José María Echevers y Valdivieso
 Manuel Martínez Mancilla
 Juan Bautista Raz y Guzmán
 José María Jáuregui
 José Rafael Suárez Pereda
 Anastasio Bustamante
 Isidro Ignacio de Icaza
 Juan José Espinosa de los Monteros – Vocal Srio

Absent Signatories 

 Juan O'Donojú
 Francisco Severo Maldonado

History of the three original documents

Three originals of the document were created and signed.

Provisional Governmental Board – first original declaration
One copy was given to the Provisional Governmental Board, which was later put on display in the Chamber of Deputies until 1909, when fire destroyed the location.

Bravo/Ruiz de Velasco – second original declaration
The Ruiz de Velasco family were the original owners for 128 years of the Acta de Independencia del Imperio Mexicano de 1821. This document was passed down through generations from Nicolás Bravo.  On August 22, 1987, Pedro Ruiz de Velasco de la Madrid gave the document as a gift to Mexico.   José Francisco Ruiz Massieu, Governor of Guerrero, accepted this gift and secured this historical document in the Museo Historico de Acapulco Fuerte de San Diego in Acapulco in the State of Guerrero.

Regency of the Empire – third original declaration
A third copy was given to the Regency of the Empire, which remained at the National Palace and was stolen in 1830. Foreign Minister Lucas Alamán made this reference about the theft:

Alamán wanted to get the record during his tenure as foreign minister but failed even when he offered a lot of money for it.

Decades later, the act was acquired by Emperor Maximilian I, although it is unknown how and where he got it. The act contains in the back the figure of the ex libris of Maximilian's library.  After Maximilian's execution, Agustin Fischer, confessor of the emperor, took the document out of the country.

Some time later, the act appeared in Spain in the library of antiquarian Gabriel Sánchez. It is also unknown how he got it, but is a fact that the act has in the back the stamp of the Spanish antiquarian library. Sánchez sold the document to the Mexican historian Joaquín García Icazbalceta, who preserved it and passed it down to his son Luis García Pimentel.

Florencio Gavito Bustillo lived in France and there he was contacted by Luis García Pimentel, who offered to sell him the Declaration of Independence. After buying the act for 10 thousand pesos he returned to Mexico with the intention of delivering the act to the Mexican government himself, but he died of leukemia in 1958. Gavito expressed in his will the wish that the act should be delivered to the president.

The Mexican government sent the document for opinions of authenticity. The opinions were ready on November 14, 1961.

The ceremony to deliver the act was held on November 21 of the same year. Florencio Gavito Jauregui, son of Gavito Bustillo gave the act to the president Adolfo López Mateos. In the ceremony were also Gustavo Díaz Ordaz, Secretary of the Interior and Jaime Torres Bodet, Secretary of Education.

The act was put on display for a while in Chapultepec Castle and then it was withdrawn and sent to the General Archive of the Nation.

In 2008, the restoration works on the act began and it was exhibited for a month at the Palace of Lecumberri. In 2010 it was put on display at the National Palace as part of the celebration of the bicentennial of the beginning of Mexico's independence. The National Institute of Anthropology and History was concerned about the exposure of the act and recommended not to expose it to more time because it does not have a special system for that.

The act is protected between two flyleaves made with acid-free materials in the vault of the General Archive of the Nation under climate monitoring. Experts of the National Autonomous University of Mexico are working on a system of preservation and exhibition of historical documents in order to permanently exhibit the act in the near future.

Gallery

See also
Act of Independence of Central America
Solemn Act of the Declaration of Independence of Northern America

References

Bibliography

Vicente Riva Palacio (1880) México a través de los siglos  Volume IV: "México Independiente". Mexico City, Cumbre.

External links

 México in documents Photograph of the original Act of Independence of the Mexican Empire of the Nation's General Archive
 Acta de Independencia del Imperio mexicano''. 500 años de México en documentos. Consulted on November 4, 2009.

Mexico
Mexican War of Independence
1821 in Mexico
1821 in New Spain
Colonial Mexico
Independent Mexico
New Spain
Political history of Mexico
September 1821 events
1821 documents